Batu is a Tivoid language of Nigeria. Dialects are Amanda-Afi, Kamino. Angwe was once assumed, but turns out to be a dialect of the divergent Buru language.

References

Languages of Nigeria
Languages of Cameroon
Tivoid languages